Canadian–Cypriot relations are foreign relations between Canada and Cyprus. Canadian bilateral political relations with Cyprus stemmed initially from Cypriot Commonwealth membership at independence in 1960 (that had followed a guerrilla struggle with Britain). These relations quickly expanded in 1964 when Canada became a major troop contributor to United Nations Peacekeeping Force in Cyprus. The participation lasted for the next 29 years, during which 50,000 Canadian soldiers served and 28 were killed. In large measure Canadian relations with Cyprus continue to revolve around support for the ongoing efforts of the UN, G8 and others to resolve the island's divided status. Contacts with Cyprus on other issues also take place in international organizations such as the UN, the Organization for Security and Co-operation in Europe and the Commonwealth of Nations.

Both countries are full members of the Commonwealth of Nations.

Bilateral commercial relations with Cyprus remain relatively modest. In 2005, Canada exported to Cyprus a little more than $10 million worth of goods and services. Canada's exports were mostly machinery, wood products and vegetables. Canadian imports from Cyprus grew in 2005 and were worth $17.8 million. They were mostly ships and boats, machinery and edible fruits and nuts. Canadian investment in Cyprus was $98 million in 2006.

Resident diplomatic missions
 Canada is accredited to Cyprus from its embassy in Athens, Greece and has an honorary consulate in Nicosia. 
 Cyprus has a high commission in Ottawa and one honorary consulate in Vancouver and Montreal.

See also
Foreign relations of Canada
Foreign relations of Cyprus
Canada–EU relations
Comprehensive Economic and Trade Agreement
Greek Cypriot diaspora
Turkish Cypriot diaspora

External links
 Canadian Ministry of Foreign Affairs and International Trade about the relations with Cyprus 
 Cypriot Ministry of Foreign Affairs: list of bilateral treaties with Canada

 
Cyprus
Bilateral relations of Cyprus
Canada and the Commonwealth of Nations
Cyprus and the Commonwealth of Nations